Guttulina is a genus of nodosariacean forams belonging to the Polymorphinidae and subfamily Polymorphinidae. The test is ovoid to elongate, inflated chambers added in a quinqueloculine spiral series, 144 deg. apart, each successive chamber extending further from the base but strongly overlapping. Sutures depressed, aperture radiate. As with all Nodosariacea the wall is of finely perforate, radial laminated calcite.

References 

 Alfred R. Loeblich Jr & Helen Tappan, 1964. Sarcodina Chiefly "Thecamoebians" and Foraminiferida; Treatise on Invertebrate Paleontology, Part C Protista 2. Geological Society of America and University of Kansas Press.

Further reading 

Foraminifera genera